Ryton is a civil parish in Shropshire, England.  It contains eleven listed buildings that are recorded in the National Heritage List for England.  All the listed buildings are designated at Grade II, the lowest of the three grades, which is applied to "buildings of national importance and special interest".  The parish contains the villages of Ryton and Grindle and the surrounding countryside.  Apart from two houses, Atchley Manor and Upper Atchley, the listed buildings are in the villages.  These consist of a church, a monument in the churchyard, houses, cottages and farmhouses, a bridge, and a former school.


Buildings

References

Citations

Sources

Lists of buildings and structures in Shropshire